Mario Lösch (born 13 September 1989) is an Austrian professional association football player, currently playing for Austrian Football Bundesliga side SV Mattersburg. He plays as a defensive midfielder.

External links

1989 births
Living people
Austrian footballers
Association football defenders
SV Mattersburg players
Austrian Football Bundesliga players